The  is a high-speed Shinkansen railway line jointly operated by East Japan Railway Company (JR East) and West Japan Railway Company (JR West), connecting Tokyo with  in the Hokuriku region of Japan. 

The route of the final section to Shin-Osaka was decided on 20 December 2016 as the Osaka–Kyoto route, with construction expected to begin in 2030 and take 15 years.

Train names and service patterns
Since March 2015, services on the line are split into four types, with train names as listed below. Trains operate over the Joetsu and Tohoku Shinkansen tracks between Tokyo and Takasaki.

  Kagayaki: Tokyo–Kanazawa, limited-stop service, since 14 March 2015
  Hakutaka: Tokyo–Kanazawa, mostly all-stations service, since 14 March 2015
  Tsurugi: Toyama–Kanazawa, all-stations shuttle service, since 14 March 2015
  Asama: Tokyo–Nagano, mostly all-stations service, corresponding to existing Nagano Shinkansen service introduced in 1997

The original Nagano Shinkansen Asama services, introduced in 1997, replaced the conventional Shin'etsu Main Line limited express services, also named Asama, which previously took 2 hours 50 minutes from Tokyo (Ueno Station) to Nagano. Following the opening of the Shinkansen, part of the conventional line was abandoned between Yokokawa and Karuizawa. This section included the steeply-graded Usui Pass which required the use of bank engines on all trains.

Stations
Legend:

 The boundary between JR East and JR West lies immediately to the north of Jōetsumyōkō Station.
 Stations in italics are not currently operational.

Notes 

Rolling stock
 E7 series 12-car "F" sets" (since 15 March 2014)
 W7 series 12-car "W" sets" (since 14 March 2015)

With the start of Nagano Shinkansen services, trains were operated by a new fleet of JR East E2 series 8-car sets. A fleet of 17 new E7 series 12-car trainsets were phased in from March 2014, and these were augmented by a fleet of 10 JR West W7 series 12-car sets introduced from March 2015. The fleet of W7 series was purchased at a cost of ¥32.8 billion. The remaining E2 series trainsets were withdrawn from Hokuriku  Shinkansen services on 31 March 2017.

In 2019, ten trains, eight from JR East with a book value of ¥11.8 billion and two from JR West, were damaged when a train yard in Nagano was flooded as the Chikuma River overflowed during typhoon Hagibis. As a result, JR West suffered a loss of ¥3 billion.

Former rolling stock
 E2 series 8-car "N" sets on Tokyo - Nagano Asama services only
 E2 series 8-car "J" sets
 E4 series 8-car "P50/P80" sets as Max Asama
 200 series 12-car set F80 during February 1998 only

The original E2 series 8-car "J" sets, primarily used on Tohoku Shinkansen services were also used on some Asama services until they were subsequently lengthened to 10 cars. One specially-modified 200 series set, numbered F80, was used on additional Asama services in February 1998 during the 1998 Winter Olympics held in Nagano. The train was modified to operate on both 25 kV AC 50 Hz and 60 Hz overhead power supplies, incorporated weight-saving measures to comply with the 16 tonne axle load restriction, and included additional control equipment to cope with the 30‰ gradient of the Nagano Shinkansen. The last services operated using eight-car E2 series trainsets ran on 31 March 2017, from which date all Asama services were formed of E7 and W7 series trainsets.

History

Nagano Shinkansen
The initial section between Takasaki and Nagano opened on 1 October 1997, in time for the 1998 Winter Olympics in Nagano.

Between May 2012 and March 2014, station platforms on the Nagano Shinkansen had their platform roofs extended to handle the E7 series 12-car trains which entered service in March 2014 ahead of the March 2015 opening of the extension beyond Nagano. The Hokuriku Shinkansen extension from Nagano to  opened in March 2015.  The 113-km extension from Kanazawa to Tsuruga was approved for construction in June 2012.

From the start of the revised timetable on 15 March 2014, E7 series trainsets were introduced on Asama services. Initially used on seven return services daily, this number was increased to eleven return services daily from 19 April 2014.

Naming 
The line's legal name has always been Hokuriku Shinkansen. However, just before the opening of the Nagano section, JR East has decided that using this name in passenger service is to be avoided. From March 22, 1997 until the extension of the Hokuriku Shinkansen to Kanazawa, the primary route for Hokuriku customers (from the Tokyo area) is to use the Joetsu Shinkansen to Echigo-Yuzawa Station, then transfer to Hakutaka via the Hokuetsu Express, rendering using the Takasaki–Nagano section of the Hokuriku Shinkansen meaningless for them. Therefore, JR East sought other names.

On the other hand, local governments in Hokuriku, fearing construction west of Nagano may be halted, petitioned that the name "Hokuriku" should remain in use for operational purposes.

JR East announced the following solution at July 25, 1997:

Voice announcements using "Nagano Shinkansen"
Tokyo area stations using depictions with "Nagano-bound Shinkansen".
Stations between Annaka-Haruna Station and Nagano Station depicting "Shinkansen" only.

Soon, "Nagano-bound Shinkansen" fell out of use, and timetables by various publishers use "Nagano Shinkansen" only. Construction to Kanazawa was officially decided, thereby reducing the opposition to the name.

Extension beyond Nagano

Construction of the extension from Nagano to Kanazawa was completed on 24 May 2014. When services commenced in March 2015, the travel time from Tokyo to Toyama was reduced to about 2 hours, with Kanazawa an additional 30 minutes away. Final permission to start construction to Fukui was granted in December 2011, with modification works to Fukui Station already in progress for several years in anticipation of the extension. The extension to Tsuruga was approved for construction on 30 June 2012, and is scheduled to open in fiscal 2024. Beyond Jōetsumyōkō Station, the line is operated by West Japan Railway Company (JR West) instead of East Japan Railway Company (JR East).

Naming issue rises again
Many people speculated about and discussed what the line's operational name should be after Nagano–Kanazawa section is completed.

Nagano economic associations argued a sudden change in name will confuse customers, propose "Nagano–Hokuriku Shinkansen" to be used. In contrast government officials and economic associations in Hokuriku region defended the legal name, including statements such as "a just result should come after 3 prefectures striving for 40 years".

Section west of Jōetsumyōkō belongs to JR West, which did not state an opinion and used "Hokuriku Shinkansen" only.

On October 2, 2013, JR East announced formal line name will be Hokuriku Shinkansen (consistent with National Shinkansen Railway Development Act) and depicted as Hokuriku Shinkansen (via Nagano), resolving the naming issue.

Test-running
Test-running on the JR East section of the line between Nagano and Kurobe-Unazukionsen commenced on 1 December 2013, initially at low speeds using the "East i" test train. Test-running continued until the end of March 2014. Test-running on the entire line between Nagano and Kanazawa (Hakusan Depot) started on 1 August 2014, using the "East i" test train.

Future plans

The following four options were under consideration, with a fifth unofficial option suggested by a local politician.
 : This involved building a full standard shinkansen track to Maibara Station. It was one third of the length of the Obama Route, and provided good access to both Kyoto and Nagoya. It would have resulted in longer travel time to Osaka than the other options, and trains would have had to use the existing, already near-capacity Tokaido Shinkansen tracks between Maibara and Shin-Osaka.
It was the shortest route to Osaka, but also the most expensive (approximately 1 trillion yen), and would have bypassed .
Including Kyoto on the route is seen as important to increase tourism.
 : Kyoto politician, Shoji Nishida's proposal from Tsuruga, via Obama, to Maizuru then south-east to Kyoto, eastern Osaka and Kansai Airport. This option was uncosted but would have been the most expensive due to the scale of the proposal. Its case was to provide development to the Maizuru region as per the Japanese national government's policy, with the Maizuru Maritime Self-Defence Force Base and several nuclear power stations put forward as reasonable traffic generators. The option to extend the line south of Kyoto to a new Osaka station (located to the south east of Osaka) and onwards to Kansai International Airport was seen as a means to avoid the congestion of the Tokaido line. It may have served as an alternative route or terminus to Shin-Osaka station for Tokaido line trains, reducing Tokaido line congestion.

On 6 March 2017 the government committee announced the chosen route from Kyoto to Shin-Osaka is to be via Kyotanabe, with a station at Matsuiyamate on the Katamachi Line.

Interim plans
In an attempt to extend the benefits of the Hokuriku Shinkansen to stations west of Tsuruga before the section to Shin-Osaka is completed, JR West was working in partnership with Talgo on the development of a Gauge Change Train (GCT), which was proposed to be capable of operating under both the 25 kV AC electrification used on the Shinkansen and the 1.5 kV DC system employed on conventional lines. The six-car train was due to start trials on the Hokuriku Shinkansen and the 1067 mm-gauge Hokuriku and Kosei lines in 2017. As part of the project JR West had begun trials with a purpose-built 180 m-long gauge-changer at Tsuruga. However, as a result of the abandonment of the proposed use of a GCT on the West Kyushu Shinkansen to Nagasaki by JR Kyushu, in August 2018 JR West announced that the proposed GCT between Tsuruga and Osaka had been abandoned.

Conventional lines running parallel to the Hokuriku Shinkansen

With the opening of the Hokuriku Shinkansen extension north of Nagano on 14 March 2015, the conventional lines running along approximately the same route were transferred from the control of their respective JR owning companies to newly established third-sector railway operating companies funded primarily by the prefectural and municipal governments through which the lines pass. Details of the four third-sector operating companies and their respective lines are as shown below.

References

External links

 JR East website 
 JR West website 
 Ishikawa Prefecture: Hokuriku Shinkansen construction page 
 Fukui Prefecture: Hokuriku Shinkansen Construction Promotion Division 

 
Railway lines opened in 1997
Lines of East Japan Railway Company
Lines of West Japan Railway Company
High-speed railway lines in Japan
Standard gauge railways in Japan
1997 establishments in Japan
25 kV AC railway electrification